Jeremiah Bishop (born March 9, 1976) is a professional mountain bike racer from the United States. He competes in ultra-endurance mountain bike racing, mountain bike stage racing, and the Olympic-discipline event of cross-country cycling.

In recent years, he has solidified his dominance as the United States' leading mountain bike stage racer. As a member of the globally dominant Topeak-Ergon Racing Team, he competes in the world's leading stage races including the Absa Cape Epic and  BIKE Transalp. He has won all of the major US-based mountain bike stage races including American Mountain Bike Classic, Breck Epic, Pisgah Mountain Bike Stage Race, and Trans-Sylvania Epic. He is a multi-time winner of the National Ultra-Endurance Series.

Prior to focusing on ultra-endurance and stage racing, in 2008 Bishop earned USA Cycling National Championship titles in the disciplines of Short Track Cross Country and Marathon Mountain Bike. In the 2007 season, he held the number one position in the rider rankings published by USA Cycling. This achievement highlighted his combined successes in cross-country, short track, and marathon-distance cycling events. Also in 2007, Bishop earned six podium results in the USA National Championship Series, including a victory at the NMBS cross-country Showdown at Sugar in Banner Elk, North Carolina. That year, he also won the silver medal in the USA National Championship cross-country race in Mount Snow, Vermont.

In 2003, Bishop won the gold medal in the cross country mountain bike event at the XIV Pan American Games held in Santo Domingo, Dominican Republic. In 2004, he broke a three-year winning streak by Canadians at the NORBA National Series by winning the cross-country event held at Waco, Texas.

Bishop is an 18-time member of the USA Cycling National Team. The USA National Team is organized by USA Cycling, the national governing body, and is affiliated with the US Olympic Committee. This ad hoc team represents the US in international competitions, including Continental and World Championships, and the Pan American Games and Olympic Games. On eight occasions, Bishop has led the National Team, producing the team's highest achievement at competition, including his gold medal winning performance in the 2003 Pan American Games and his eighth-place finish at the 2006 UCI World Championships held in Rotorua, New Zealand.

Bishop is featured in the award-winning documentary, Off Road to Athens. In 2008, he appeared as himself in the film Max VO2: the Potential Inside. Red Cloud Productions plans to tell Bishop's story in a film about his life.

Bishop is a member of the Canyon Topeak Racing Team. He resides in Harrisonburg, Virginia.

Career highlights
 Pan American Games Gold Medalist
 18-time Member of USA National Team
 Eighth Place – Pro Cross Country – 2006 UCI World Championships – Roturua, New Zealand
 Winner – Pro Cross Country – 2007 NCS – Sugar Mt, North Carolina
 Winner – Pro Cross Country – 2006 NORBA National – Aspen, Colorado
 Highest Ranked Pro Male Cross Country Racer – 2006 USA Cycling Rankings
 Winner – Pro Marathon Cross Country – 2006 NORBA National – Brian Head, Utah
 Winner – Pro Marathon Cross Country – 2005 NORBA National – Snowshoe, West Virginia
 Winner – Pro Marathon Cross Country – 2005 NORBA National – Tapatio Springs, Texas
 Winner – Pro Cross Country – 2004 Maxxis Cup International – Pontevedro, Spain
 Winner – Pro Cross Country – 2004 NORBA National – Waco, Texas

2007 season highlights
 Member USA National Team – 2007 UCI World Championships – Fort William, Scotland
 Member USA National Team – 2007 Continental Championships – Villa la Angostura, Argentina
 12 – American Continental MTB Championships – Villa la Angostura, Argentina
 6 – Pro Time Trial – Nova National – Fountain Hills, Arizona
 9 – Pro Cross Country – Nova National – Fountain Hills, Arizona
 9 – Pro Short Track – Nova National – Fountain Hills, Arizona
 8 – Pro Cross Country – Sea Otter Classic – Monterey, California
 4 – Pro Cross Country – Greenbriar Challenge – Frederick, Maryland
 9 – Pro Cross Country – Fontana National – Fontana, California
 6 – Pro Short Track – Fontana National – Fontana, California
 30 – Pro Cross Country – UCI World Cup – Offenburg, Germany
 3 – Pro Cross Country – Osterreich Grand Prix – Windhaag bei Perg, Austria
 23 – Pro Cross Country – UCI World Cup – Champery, Switzerland
 3 – Pro Cross Country – Deer Valley NCS – Deer Valley, Utah
 9 – Pro Short Track – Deer Valley NCS – Deer Valley, Utah
 2 – Pro Cross Country – USA National Championships – Mount Snow, Vermont
 8 – Pro Short Track – USA National Championships – Mount Snow, Vermont
 1 – Pro Cross Country – Showdown at Sugar NCS – Sugar Mountain, North Carolina
 5 – Pro Short Track – Showdown at Sugar NCS – Sugar Mountain, North Carolina
 7- Pro Short Track – Snowmass NCS Final – Aspen/Snowmass, Colorado
 2 – Pro Cross Country – Snowmass NCS Final – Aspen/Snowmass, Colorado
 33 – Pro Cross Country – UCI World Championships – Fort William, Scotland
 24 – Pro Cross Country – UCI World Cup – Maribor, Slovenia
 1 – Open Men Hillclimb- Poor Mountain Hillclimb – Roanoke, Virginia
 2 – Elite Cross Country – Poor Farm Fall Cup – Richmond, Virginia
 2 – Elite Cat 1 – Ed Sander Memorial Cyclocross – Buckeystown, Maryland
 3 – Elite Cat 1 – Capitol Cross Classic – Reston, Virginia

2006 season highlights
 1st Overall Ranked Pro Male – USA Cycling Rider Rankings
 1st Shenandoah 100 – Stokesville, Virginia
 1st NORBA XC National, Snow Mass, CO.
 3rd overall NORBA National XC series
 1st NORBA Marathon National, Brian Head, Utah
 1st Mt. Mitchell Challenge

2005 season highlights
 1st NORBA NMBS Marathon – Tapatio Springs, Texas
 1st Iron Grind Stage Race – Tapatio Springs, Texas
 2nd NORBA NMBS Cross Country – Snowshoe, West Virginia
 1st NORBA NMBS Marathon – Snowshoe, West Virginia

2004 season highlights
 1st Voroklini International – Voroklini – Cyprus
 1st Norba National Series Race 1 – Waco, Texas – USA
 3rd Ultimate Dirt Challenge – Rincon, Puerto Rico – USA
 2004 Continental Championship USA National Team
 4th 2004 Continental Championship – Banos – Ecuador
 1st Maxxis Cup International – Pontavedra – Spain
 2004 World Marathon Championships USA National Team
 2004 World Championship USA National Team
 1st Shenandoah 100 – Stokesville, Virginia – USA
 1st Volkswagen Iron Cross – Michaux, Pennsylvania – USA

2003 season highlights
 Gold Medallist XIIV Pan American Games
 2003 World Championship USA National Team
 2nd NORBA NCS Finals – Durango, CO
 3rd NORBA NCS – Mt Snow, VT
 4th National Championship Series Overall
 4th NORBA NCS Overall Ranking
 2nd NORBA Overall Rider Ranking
 2nd Durango NCS #5
 1st Tour de Burg Stage Race
 1st 24-Hours of Snowshoe, Co-ed Pro/AM Team
 3rd Mt Snow NCS #3

2002 season highlights
 1st Shenandoah Mountain 100
 1st AMBC Showdown at Sugar, Banner Elk
 Mid-Atlantic Cup Cyclocross Series Champion
 Virginia Cyclocross Series Champion
 Virginia Mountain Bike Series Champion
 6th TransAlp Bike Challenge Stage Race
 1st- Stage 8 – TransAlp Bike Challenge
 World Champion Team – 24-Hour Team Relay
 1st Tour de Burg Stage Race
 1st 24-Hours of Snowshoe
 1st Michaux Ironmasters Classic

External links
 Jeremiah Bishop's website
 
 

1976 births
American male cyclists
Living people
Cyclists at the 2003 Pan American Games
Cyclists at the 2011 Pan American Games
Cross-country mountain bikers
Marathon mountain bikers
Place of birth missing (living people)
Pan American Games bronze medalists for the United States
Pan American Games medalists in cycling
American mountain bikers
Medalists at the 2003 Pan American Games
Medalists at the 2011 Pan American Games